"Hearts / Wires"  is a single by American alternative metal band Deftones, released on April 4, 2016 as the third single from their eighth studio album, Gore. "Hearts / Wires" came as a free download audio file for each physical copy of Gore purchased from the band's official web store.

No official music video exists for the song. However, the band approved of an unofficial music video, which they shared to their official Facebook page.

Stephen Carpenter told Rolling Stone that he was initially taken aback by "Hearts / Wires" because it evoked images of murder, rape, insanity and the serial killer from The Silence of the Lambs. "That song made me think of Wild Bill the whole time – psycho killer and shit. I just didn't feel it," Carpenter said. "I had to embrace my inner psycho rapist and come up with the part and get into it."

Track listing

References

External links 

 Deftones - Hearts/Wires (Unofficial Video) at YouTube
 Deftones - Hearts/Wires (Unofficial Video) at Vimeo

Deftones songs
Songs written by Chino Moreno
Songs written by Sergio Vega (bassist)
Songs written by Stephen Carpenter
Songs written by Abe Cunningham
Songs written by Frank Delgado (American musician)
Space rock songs